The List of mayors of Missoula, Montana begins with the establishment of the town of Missoula in 1883 (incorporated as a city two years later) with Judge Frank H. Woody serving as mayor.  In 1883 Missoula used an aldermanic form of government that was approved with the town charter.  The city adopted a commission-council form of government in 1911 with the opening of new City Hall and a council–manager government in 1954 before returning to an aldermanic form of government in 1959.  Since January 1, 1997, Missoula has been governed in accordance with the Missoula City Charter, which calls for a mayor-council system of government.

The current system comprises a mayor and city treasurer elected in a citywide vote and twelve city council members who must reside in and are elected from one of six wards with each ward having two council members.  All positions are nominally nonpartisan.  Council members and the mayor are elected to four-year terms with council-member elections being staggered to allow only one member from each ward to up for re-election.  There are no term limits for either position.

List of Mayors

References

External links
 Juliet Gregory Papers (University of Montana Archives)

Missoula
Mayors